The Women's trap event took place on 28 July 2014 at the Barry Buddon Shooting Centre. There was a qualification to determine the final participants.

Results

Qualification

Semifinals

QB: Qualified to Bronze

QG: Qualified to Gold

Finals

References

Shooting at the 2014 Commonwealth Games
Common